Islay "Izzy" Molina (born June 3, 1971 in New York City, New York) is an American former professional baseball catcher for the Oakland Athletics and Baltimore Orioles of Major League Baseball (MLB).

Molina is not related to the brothers Bengie, Jose, and Yadier Molina, although like Izzy, all three are catchers.

Career
Molina was drafted out of high school by the Oakland Athletics in the 22nd round of the 1990 Major League Baseball Draft and made his professional debut that same year for the Arizona League Athletics where he batted .339 in 39 games. He made his major league debut for Oakland on August 15, . Molina left the Athletics via free agency after the  season. On October 26, 1998, he signed with the Arizona Diamondbacks, but was traded to the New York Yankees with Ben Ford for Darren Holmes in spring training .

Over the next three years, Molina did not play in the majors while spending time in the minors with the Yankees, Royals, and Blue Jays organization.

He signed a minor-league contract with the Baltimore Orioles on November 20, 2001. He began the 2002 season with the Double-A Bowie Baysox and was promoted to the Triple-A Rochester Red Wings. Two weeks after his contract was purchased from the Red Wings on May 3, he cleared waivers and was outrighted to the Baysox on May 17. During this stint he made his only appearance with the Orioles in a 9–4 defeat to the Cleveland Indians at Camden Yards on May 6. He had a fifth-inning single in three at bats and scored a run as the starting catcher.

References

External links

1971 births
Living people
Aberdeen IronBirds players
American expatriate baseball players in Canada
Arizona League Athletics players
Baltimore Orioles players
Bowie Baysox players
Columbus Clippers players
Edmonton Trappers players
Huntsville Stars players
Major League Baseball catchers
Madison Muskies players
Modesto A's players
Oakland Athletics players
Ottawa Lynx players
Reno Silver Sox players
Rochester Red Wings players
Baseball players from New York City
Syracuse SkyChiefs players
Tacoma Tigers players
Christopher Columbus High School (Miami-Dade County, Florida) alumni